is a Japanese politician. She is a member of the House of Representatives for the Liberal Democratic Party. She briefly served as Minister of Economy, Trade and Industry during the Abe government, but was forced to resign. She is the second daughter of Keizo Obuchi, who served as Prime Minister of Japan from 1998 until his death in office in 2000.

Early life 

Obuchi was born in Tokyo in 1973. She graduated from Seijo University and joined the broadcaster TBS in 1996.

Political career 
Obuchi began working as an aide to her father in 1999. She was elected to the House of Representatives for the first time in the 2000 general election, winning her late father's Diet seat after his death in office.

Aso government 
On September 24, 2008, Obuchi was appointed Minister of State for Social Affairs and Gender Equality in the cabinet of Prime Minister Tarō Asō. This made her Japan's youngest cabinet member in the post-war era.

Abe government 
In December 2012, she was appointed Vice Minister of Finance by the new Prime Minister Shinzō Abe, and on 3 September 2014, she was made Minister of Economy, Trade and Industry in Abe's cabinet. As such, she became the minister responsible for the nuclear industry in Japan, with partial responsibility for the Fukushima Daiichi nuclear disaster clean-up. She was viewed at the time as a potential candidate for prime minister.

Obuchi resigned from her position as the Minister of Economy, Trade and Industry on October 19, 2014, amid allegations of misuse of political contributions. Her departure was seen as a blow to the Abe government. An investigation committee found in October 2015 that Obuchi had no legal responsibility for the scandal, as the false entries had been made by two of her aides without her knowledge.

Personal life 
Obuchi is married and has two sons. Her husband, Kazuaki Setoguchi, joined TBS at the same time as Obuchi in 1996. They married in December 2004 after dating for several years.

References

External links 
  

Children of prime ministers of Japan
Government ministers of Japan
Members of the House of Representatives (Japan)
Women government ministers of Japan
Female members of the House of Representatives (Japan)
Politicians from Tokyo
People from Gunma Prefecture
Living people
1973 births
Liberal Democratic Party (Japan) politicians
21st-century Japanese politicians
21st-century Japanese women politicians
Seijo University alumni
Waseda University alumni
20th-century Japanese women
Members of the House of Representatives from Gunma Prefecture